Cue sports events were contested at the Asian Games starting from the 1998 Games in Bangkok.

Editions

Events

Medal table

Participating nations

List of medalists

See also 
 Billiards and snooker at the Southeast Asian Games
 Cue sports at the World Games

References 
Sports123

 
Sports at the Asian Games
Asian Games